Juma Abudu (born 11 November 1963) is a Kenyan weightlifter. He competed in the 1988 Summer Olympics.

References

1963 births
Living people
Weightlifters at the 1988 Summer Olympics
Kenyan male weightlifters
Olympic weightlifters of Kenya